Sweden competed at the 1968 Winter Olympics in Grenoble, France.

Medalists

Alpine skiing

Men

Men's slalom

Women

Biathlon

Men

 1 One minute added per close miss (a hit in the outer ring), two minutes added per complete miss.

Men's 4 x 7.5 km relay

 2 A penalty loop of 200 metres had to be skied per missed target.

Bobsleigh

Cross-country skiing

Men

Men's 4 × 10 km relay

Women

Women's 3 x 5 km relay

Figure skating

Men

Ice hockey

Summary

Medal Round 

  Sweden –  USA 4:3  (0:0, 4:2, 0:1)
Goalscorers: Nilsson, Wickberg, Hedlund, Bengsston – Falkman, Lilyholm, Nanne.
Referees: McEvoy, Kubinec (CAN)

  Sweden –  West Germany 5:4  (4:3, 0:0, 1:1)
Goalscorers: Svedberg, Lundström, Nordlander, Olsson, Öberg – Kuhn, Hanig, Reif, Kopf.  
Referees: Kořínek, Bucala (TCH)

  Sweden –  East Germany 5:2  (1:0, 2:1, 2:1)
Goalscorers: Hedlund 2, Wickberg, Lundström, Henriksson – Plotka, Fuchs.
Referees: Seglin (URS), Wycisk (POL)

  Sweden –  Finland 5:1  (1:0, 2:1, 2:0)
Goalscorers: Wickberg 2, Granholm, Nillsson, Bengsston – Oksanen.
Referees: Kubinec (CAN), Kořínek (TCH)

 USSR –   Sweden  3:2  (1:1, 0:0, 2:1)
Goalscorers: Firsov 2, Blinov – Öberg, Svedberg.
Referees: Kubinec (CAN), Kořínek (TCH)

  Sweden –  Canada 0:3  (0:2, 0.0, 0:1)
Goalscorers: Johnston, G. Pinder, O‘Shea.
Referees: Sillankorva (FIN), Kořínek (TCH)

 Czechoslovakia –   Sweden  2:2  (1:1, 1:0, 0:1) 
Goalscorers: Golonka, Hrbatý – Bengtsson, Henriksson.
Referees: Trumble (USA), Sillankorva (FIN)

Contestants
4. SWEDEN
Goaltenders: Leif Holmqvist, Hans Dahllöf. 
Defence: Arne Carlsson, Nils Johansson, Bert-Olov Nordlander, Lars-Erik Sjöberg, Roland Stoltz,  Lennart Svedberg.  
Forwards: Folke Bengtsson, Svante Granholm, Henric Hedlund, Leif Henriksson, Tord Lundström, Lars-Göran Nilsson, Roger Olsson, Björn Palmqvist, Håkan Wickberg, Carl-Göran Öberg.
Coach: Arne Strömberg.

Luge

Men

(Men's) Doubles

Women

Ski jumping

Speed skating

Men

Women

References
 Olympic Winter Games 1968, full results by sports-reference.com

Nations at the 1968 Winter Olympics
1968